SIAI may refer to:
 The Singularity Institute for Artificial Intelligence, an organization renamed in 2013 to the Machine Intelligence Research Institute
 Società Idrovolanti Alta Italia, an Italian aircraft manufacturer